Patricia May Edgar AM is an Australian author, television producer, educator and media scholar best known as the founding director of the Australian Children's Television Foundation.

Early life
She was born in Mildura, Victoria, and moved to California in the 1960s with her husband (author and social researcher Dr. Don Edgar) and two children to study for an MA in Communication at Stanford University. On their return to Australia, Edgar joined the staff of La Trobe University as the inaugural Head of the Centre for the Study of media and Communication. She introduced the first courses on film and television production and cinema studies in an Australian University. At La Trobe she also completed a PhD.

Roles
Dr Patricia Edgar served on several government committees, such as the Australian Broadcasting Control Board which she was appointed to by Gough Whitlam's government in 1975. Whilst part of this committee she was instrumental in formulating codes for children's television for the first time. She was also involved in the Australian National Commission of UNESCO, Film Victoria, the Council of the Australian Film and Television School, the Victorian Government's Board of CIRCIT Ltd (Centre for International Research on Communication and Information Technologies) and the Victorian Post-Secondary Education Commission. Dr Edgar also served as an Associate Member of the Australian Broadcasting Tribunal's Inquiry into Violence on Television from 1988 to 1989. She was Deputy Chairman of the Australian Film Finance Corporation Limited between 1988 and 1995. Additionally, she chaired the ACMI Foundation from 2004 to 2006 and is the founding chair of the Breast Cancer Network of Australia which she served as chairman of from 1998 to 2009. 

Dr Edgar was the founding director of the Australian Children's Television Foundation (ACTF). Over twenty years, the ACTF produced 174 hours of television drama and won more than 100 national and international awards including an International Emmy, two Logies, four AFI Awards, a Japan Prize, a Banff Rockie Award, the Prix Jeunesse and a Grand Jury Prize. The ACTF also made co-productions with the BBC, Disney and Revcom. While she was director of the ACTF she produced a number of outstanding children's television programs for all ages which included Round the Twist, Lift Off, The Genie From Down Under, Touch the Sun, Winners, Kaboodle, Crash Zone, L'il Elvis Jones and the Truckstoppers, Noah and Saskia, Kaboodle, Yolngu Boy and Kahootz.

In 1995 she formed and hosted the first World Summit on Television and Children. This Summit was held in Melbourne, Australia and was attended by more than 600 delegates from 70 countries around the world. She is currently Deputy Chair of the World Summit on media for Children Foundation, but served as Chair for seventeen years. 

Recently, she became an ambassador for the National Ageing Research Institute.

Publications
She is the author of fifteen books. Much of her research and writing has focused on children and television. Her books about television and the media include Children and Screen Violence, Under Five in Australia, Media She (with Hilary McPhee), The Politics of the Press and recently a memoir Bloodbath: A Memoir of Australian Television which prompted Phillip Adams to write "I would regard Patricia Edgar as a sort of human tank.  Patricia is a sort of Centurion in her abilities to kick down doors and push walls over.  She is annoying, irritating, relentless, drives people mad, but she gets things done".

Books
 Australia and Her Northern Neighbours, Don Edgar and Patricia Edgar, Halls, 1974
 Under 5 in Australia, Don Edgar, Patricia Edgar and others, Heinemann, 1973  
 Media She, Patricia Edgar and Hilary McPhee, Heinemann, 1974  
 Children and Screen Violence, Patricia Edgar, Queensland University Press, 1977  
 The Politics of the Press, Patricia Edgar, Sun Books, 1979  
 The News In Focus: the Journalism of Exception, Patricia Edgar, Macmillan, 1980  
 Communication Policy in Developed Countries, Patricia Edgar and Syed Rahim (eds), Routledge and Kegan Paul, 1983
 Janet Holmes a Court, Patricia Edgar, 1999, Harper Collins  
 Bloodbath: A Memoir of Australian Television, Patricia Edgar, Melbourne University Press, 2006  
 The New Child : In Search of Smarter Grown-Ups, Patricia Edgar and Don Edgar, Wilkinson Publishing, 2008  
 The Fairies of Plant Street, Patricia Edgar and Don Edgar, Edgar Publishing, 2012
 Big Fat Porkies and Little White Lies, Patricia Edgar and Ace Buck, Edgar Publishing, 2013
 In Praise of Ageing, Patricia Edgar, Text Publishing, 2013
 Peak: Reinventing Middle Age, Patricia Edgar and Don Edgar, Text Publishing, 2017
 Kids: Technology and the Future, Patricia Edgar, Australian Book Marketing, 2019\

Reports
 Families Without Television, Patricia Edgar and Ray Crooke, Centre for the Study of Educational Communication and Media, LaTrobe University, 1976  
 Television License Hearings Go Public: a case study, Patricia Edgar, Centre for the Study of Educational Communication and Media, LaTrobe University, 1981  
 Children and Television: policy implications, Patricia Edgar, Australian Children's Television Foundation, 1983.  
 Children's Television: the case for regulation, Patricia Edgar, Australian Children's Television Foundation,1984

Further Selected Publications
 The Unknown Audience, Patricia Edgar and Ursula Callus, Centre for the Study of Educational Communication and Media, 1979
 Sex Type Socialization and television Family Comedy Programmes, Patricia Edgar, Centre for the Study of Educational Communication and Media
 A Survey of Audio Visual Facilities in Universities in the USA, Canada, United Kingdom and Australia, Patricia Edgar, Centre for the Study of Educational Communication and Media

Honors & Qualifications 
Patricia Edgar has a BA and a BEd from the University of Melbourne, a Master of Arts from Stanford University, and a PhD from La Trobe University. In 1994 the University of Western Australia awarded her an honorary Doctor of Letters (Hon DLitt). In May of 2018, LaTrobe University awarded her a Doctor of Letters (honoris causa). 

In 1986, she was appointed Member of the General Division of the Order of Australia for her services to children's television and the media. In 1988, she was a finalist at the Bicentennial BHP Awards for the Pursuit of Excellence. In 1992 on World Communications Day she was given the Award of the Archbishop of Sydney Citation. She was a finalist in the Victorian of the Year Awards for 1995. In the same year, she was awarded for her outstanding contribution to children at the World Summit on Television and Children. The following year she was chosen as a she was given the Award of the Archbishop of Sydney Citation.

She was awarded the Australian College of Education medal in 1998 and an Achiever Award from the Committee for Melbourne in 2001. She received both of these awards as recognition for her exceptional contribution to using the medium of television as a form of education.

Additionally, in 2001, the ACTF was awarded the Youth TV Prize at the 18th International Scientific Audio-visual Conference - Image and Science in Paris as recognition for the quality of work the ACTF had produced. She was named on the Victorian Honor Roll of Women "Dr Patricia Edgar, AM (1981 - Founding Director of the innovative Australian Children's Television Foundation)" which recognises women of achievement that have made a difference in Victoria, Australia or internationally. In 2002, the Australian Film Institute presented her with the Australian Film Institute Longford Life Achievement Award, the highest accolade the AFI can bestow. In 2003, the Governor General awarded her with the Centenary Medal to mark Dr Edgar's contribution "to children's television, education programs". Finally, in 2007, she was awarded the Dromkeen Medal for her role in advancing children's literature.

References

External links
 
 

1937 births
Living people
Australian non-fiction writers
Australian activists
Members of the Order of Australia
University of Melbourne alumni
Stanford University alumni
Academic staff of La Trobe University
People from Mildura
University of Melbourne women
Writers from Victoria (Australia)